Paulo Henrique Petit Carrera da Silva (born 23 February 1989), known as Paulinho Le Petit, is a Brazilian footballer who plays for Portuguesa as a forward.

Career

Brazil
Born in São Carlos, Le Petit began his career in his native Brazil, playing for Votoraty, Grêmio Osasco, São Bento and Desportivo Brasil.

United States
Le Petit moved to the United States in March 2010 when he was signed by USSF Division 2 club Miami FC, a result of Miami FC owner Traffic Sports ongoing relationship with Desportivo Brasil. He played 14 games and scored 1 goal for Miami before converting over to the Fort Lauderdale Strikers prior to the beginning of the 2011 North American Soccer League season.

On June 8, 2014 Le Petit signed with Miami Dade FC.

References

External links
 Miami FC bio
 Traffic Sport profile

1989 births
Living people
Brazilian footballers
Association football forwards
Esporte Clube São Bento players
Desportivo Brasil players
Tupi Football Club players
Esporte Clube Democrata players
Veranópolis Esporte Clube Recreativo e Cultural players
Associação Portuguesa de Desportos players
Miami FC (2006) players
Fort Lauderdale Strikers players
Brazilian expatriate sportspeople in the United States
Expatriate soccer players in the United States
USSF Division 2 Professional League players
North American Soccer League players